Choi Sung-hee (born February 28, 1980), known professionally as Bada, is a South Korean singer-songwriter, composer, musical actress and television presenter. She debuted as a member of the South Korean girl group S.E.S. in 1997. After S.E.S. disbanded in December 2002, she released her first solo studio album, A Day of Renew, in October 2003. Since then, she continued her active singing career with songs such as Aurora, Eyes, V.I.P, GoGoGo, Queen, and Mad.

Apart from recording and performing songs, she has established herself as an actress, notably through her participation in the original and Korean versions of stage musicals including Notre-Dame de Paris, 200 Pounds Beauty, Legally Blonde, and Mozart!. She won Best Actress at the third Musical Awards and has starred in ten musicals to date.

Early life
Choi Sung-hee was born February 28, 1980. Her father is Choi Sae-wol, a trot singer with a background in Korean pansori. Due to financial struggle during her childhood, especially after her father fell ill, she lived in a container home provided by a local church for nine years until her debut. In a series of lectures for youth, she has addressed her beginning and has encouraged students to not let their background become an obstacle in obtaining their dreams.

Bada was scouted by Lee Soo-man and entered SM Entertainment. She debuted as the leader and lead vocal of S.E.S., the first successful female K-pop idol group.

Bada studied theater at Dankook University.

Career

1997–2002: Career with S.E.S.

Bada made her debut with S.E.S. in 1997. The group released their debut album I'm Your Girl on November 1, 1997. The group later became the top-selling K-pop girl group. Since their debut, the group has released five Korean albums, two Japanese albums as well as a Japanese compilation album. 
The group released a Korean compilation album, Friend before breaking up at the end of 2002. Members Bada and Eugene parted ways from SM Entertainment, while Shoo stayed with SM Entertainment until 2006.

2003–2008: A Day of Renew, Aurora, Made in Sea and Musical acting 
Bada signed an exclusive contract with WoongJin entertainment. In 2003, Bada released her debut solo album A Day of Renew that has sold approximately 130,000 records, according to the Music Industry Association of Korea. Bada became the first Korean idol singer to venture onto the musical stage in 2003 with the musical Peppermint, a love story about a singer named Bada. It was written for her by creator and producer Lee Yu-ri, who is also responsible for other musical projects such as Typhoon, Mother and Winter Sonata.
In 2004, her second album Aurora was released and has sold approximately 23,000 copies.

In 2006, her third album, Made in Sea, was a big success. In 2007, Bada was cast in the role of Denise in the Korean version of Andrew Lloyd Webber's Tell Me on a Sunday. Right afterward, she took on the role of Esmeralda as a part of the original Korean cast of Notre-Dame de Paris. Her widely praised portrayal of Esmeralda gained her acceptance as a musical actress and won her the Best Newcomer Actress award and others at The Musical Awards and the Korea Musical Daesangs in 2008; she reprised the role in 2009.

2009–2013: See the Sea and Musical acting 
In 2009, Bada released her fourth
album called See the Sea which featured both Korean rap group Untouchable and 2PM's Ok Taec-yeon.
The following year, 200 Pounds Beauty, a musical based on the popular movie of the same name, cast Bada in the titular role of Kang Han-byul, an overweight ghost singer who aspires to become a star and undergoes extensive plastic surgery. Bada's turn as Kang earned her the Best Actress honor at the third The Musical Awards. She was recast in 2011 for the project.

In 2010, Bada played Peggy Sawyer in Broadway on 42nd Street

In 2012, she briefly took on the role of Mozart's wife, Constanze, in Mozart!,

In June 2013, she was cast as Elle Woods in Legally Blonde. During Legally Blonde, her mother died. Despite the loss, Bada continued performances for the musical until its final run and famously sang Secret Garden's "You Raise Me Up" on KBS's Open Music Concert just two days after her mother's death. She has since stated that this loss was the reason for her relative inactivity in both her music and musical career from 2011 to mid-2013. She also cast as Marguerite in the first Korean adaptation of Frank Wildhorn's The Scarlet Pimpernel. That same year, Bada appeared as a vocalist for the song "City Life" on American musician Brian Transeau's album A Song Across Wires.

She returned as Esmeralda in the 2013 production of Notre-Dame de Paris. She then signed on to depict Carmen in the first Korean production of the musical Carmen.

2016–2017: 20th anniversary debut project 
On May 28, Bada, along with S.E.S. members Eugene and Shoo, attended a charity event, Green Heart Bazaar. Bada released a special album titled Flower on June 13, 2016, to celebrate her 20th debut anniversary. The album contains four tracks with lead single "Flower" featuring popular rapper Kanto. She released double music video for "Flower" on June 13 and "Amazing" on June 15. A few weeks later, Bada released a special summer album titled Summertime on June 26. Bada later released collaboration single "Cosmic" with Super Junior's Ryeowook on September 22, as a part of SM Entertainment project SM Station.

In October 2016, Bada, along with Eugene and Shoo re-formed S.E.S. to celebrate their 20 years debut. They started their project of the 20th anniversary debut with released digital single "Love[Story]", a remake of their 1999 single "Love", through SM Entertainment's digital project SM Station on November 28 and its music video released on December 29.

In early December 2016, they aired their ten episode reality show Remember, I'm Your S.E.S., which broadcast through mobile app Oksusu. To accompany their 20th anniversary debut, they held a concert Remember, the Day, on December 30 and 31 at Sejong University's Daeyang Hall in Seoul.

On January 2, the special album of their 20th anniversary debut Remember was released. The album consists of double lead singles. "Remember" was digitally released on January 1 and "Paradise" was released along with the album on January 2. They held a fanmeet as their last project of their 20th anniversary debut called I Will Be There, Waiting for You on March 1, 2017.

In July 2017, she became the vocal mentor for survival show Idol School.

Bada successfully held her solo concert for the 20th anniversary debut, Twenty Steps, on December 31, 2017, at the grand hall of Unjeong Green Campus at Sungshin Women's University.

2019–present: Off The Record 

On October 14, 2019, Wave Nine announced Bada's comeback with a single title "Off The Record" set to release for October 24.

On April 19, 2020, Bada teamed up with 33 singers to release a remake song of Yang Hee-eun's "Evergreen" for the medical professionals around the world fighting COVID-19 and also to mark the 60th anniversary of the April 19 Revolution.

Personal life
On January 13, 2017, her agency confirmed that she would marry a franchise restaurant owner nine years her junior. Her wedding was held in Seoul on March 23, 2017. On August 30, 2020, Bada posted a letter on her fancafe announcing her pregnancy. On September 7, 2020, she gave birth to her first child, a daughter.

Discography

Albums
 A Day of Renew (2003)
 Aurora (2004)
 Made in Sea (2006)
 See the Sea (2009)

Special albums
 Flower (2016)
 Summertime (2016)

Singles

Participation in albums

Concerts
 Showman aLIVE (2006)
 Varacon (2009)
 Varacon Encore Concert (2010)
 Varacon X-MAS Special (2010)
 Alive Show Vol.1 (2014)

Filmography

Film

Television

Musicals

Awards
 21st Korean Best Dresser Award – Female Artist (2004)
 Mnet KM Music Video Festival – PD Special Award (2005)
 13th Korean Arts Awards – Female Dance Artist (2006)
 4th Korean Fashion World Awards – Best Dressed Artist (2006)
 Korean Model Awards – Popular Artist (2007)
 2nd The Musical Awards – Popular Female Actress (2008)
 14th Korea Musical Daesang – Popular Star (2008)
 14th Korea Musical Daesang – Best Newcomer Actress (2008)
 3rd The Musical Awards – Best Actress (2009)
 15th Korea Musical Daesang – Popular Star (2009)

Honorary ambassador
 Yeosu Expo Sea Love (2007)
 City of Seoul (2008)
 Save the West Coast (2008)
 We Start Recreation Headquarters (2008)
 Catholic Life Committee (2009)
 3rd The Musical Awards (2009)
 Tour de Korea (2013)

References

External links

 Bada's Official Site 
 

1980 births
Living people
South Korean women pop singers
South Korean musical theatre actresses
South Korean female idols
S.E.S. (group) members
South Korean humanitarians
Dankook University alumni
South Korean Roman Catholics
People from Bucheon
People from Gyeonggi Province

pt:Bada
vi:Bada